Bad-jacketing is a term for planting doubt on the authenticity of an individual's bona fides or identity.  An example would be creating suspicion through spreading false rumors, manufacturing evidence, etc., that falsely portray someone in a community organization as an informant, or member of law enforcement, or guilty of malfeasance such as skimming organization funds. 

Snitch-jacketing is a variant of bad-jacketing that specifically aims to present the target as an informer.

History
Scholar Mark Anthony Neal writes that the Federal Bureau of Investigation (FBI) under J. Edgar Hoover used the technique against the Black Panther Party (BPP) and other Black Power organizations as part of its COINTELPRO operations. Neal writes that this technique was effective in isolating key individuals, forcing them out of the organization, and that its effectiveness was enhanced by the tendency of Black Power activists to divide among "rigid racial, ideological, and increasingly gendered" lines. The practice was notably used by the FBI informants to create a climate of suspicion within the Black Panther Party and American Indian Movement (AIM), which resulted in the murder of a number of AIM activists that had been subjected to bad-jacketing, including Pedro Bissonette, Byron DeSersa and Anna Mae Aquash.

Jo Durden-Smith claims that this technique was used by U.S. prison guards to undermine targeted prisoners and thus make them vulnerable to manipulation.

References

Bibliography

Black Panther Party
Police weapons
Federal Bureau of Investigation operations